Kosmos 166 ( meaning Cosmos 166), also known as DS-U3-S No.1, was a satellite which was launched by the Soviet Union in 1967 as part of the Dnepropetrovsk Sputnik programme. It was a  spacecraft, which was built by the Yuzhnoye Design Office, and was used to conduct multispectral imaging of the Sun.

Kosmos 166 was launched from Site 86/1 at Kapustin Yar, aboard a Kosmos-2I 63SM carrier rocket. The launch occurred at 04:44:00 GMT on 16 June 1967, and resulted in the successful insertion of the satellite into a low Earth orbit. Upon reaching orbit, the satellite was assigned its Kosmos designation, and received the International Designator 1967-061A. The North American Air Defense Command assigned it the catalogue number 02848.

Kosmos 166 was the first of two DS-U3-S satellites to be launched, the other being Kosmos 230. It completed operations on 26 September 1967, before decaying from orbit and reentering the atmosphere on 25 October.

See also

 1967 in spaceflight

References

Spacecraft launched in 1967
Kosmos satellites
1967 in the Soviet Union
Dnepropetrovsk Sputnik program